Frederick Lewis Wiley (March 28, 1895 - July 8, 1974), nicknamed "The Atlanta Surprise", was an American Negro league pitcher in the 1920s.

A native of Pike County, Georgia, Wiley made his Negro leagues debut in 1920 with the Pennsylvania Red Caps of New York. He went on to spend several seasons with the Lincoln Giants through 1927.

References

External links
 and Baseball-Reference Black Baseball stats and Seamheads

1895 births
1974 deaths
Lincoln Giants players
Pennsylvania Red Caps of New York players
20th-century African-American sportspeople
Baseball pitchers